The 1929 South Carolina Gamecocks football team was an American football team that represented the University of South Carolina as a member of the Southern Conference (SoCon) during the 1929 season. Led by second-year head coach Billy Laval, the Gamecocks compiled an overall record of 6–5 with a mark of 2–5 in conference play, placing 15th in the SoCon. Captain and center Julian Beall was second-team All-Southern.

Schedule

References

South Carolina
South Carolina Gamecocks football seasons
South Carolina Gamecocks football